The 1977 Oman cyclone was the deadliest tropical cyclone on record to strike Oman. The storm struck Masirah Island and later southern Oman on June 13, before dissipating the next day over Saudi Arabia. About 95% of Marisah Island was damaged by the strong winds, including much of the military base. The cyclone dropped  of rainfall over a 24-hour period on Marisah, which was the highest daily total in the country as of 2003. Overall, the storm killed at least 105 people and left 50,000 homeless.

Meteorological history

That day, the Joint Typhoon Warning Center (JTWC) began tracking the system. The storm moved northward, followed by a northwest turn on June 10. In addition, the India Meteorological Department estimated the system became a severe cyclonic storm, which has sustained winds of at least . On June 12, the storm attained a minimum pressure of  while continuing westward.

The JTWC issued the final advisory at 0800 UTC that day. The cyclone was the strongest on record to make landfall on the Arabian Peninsula, until Cyclone Gonu surpassed it in 2007. Shortly after striking Masirah, the storm moved ashore mainland Oman, causing rapid weakening to tropical depression status. The system dissipated on June 14 after crossing into southeastern Saudi Arabia.

Impact and aftermath
The waves affected several drilling rigs operated by the Oil and Natural Gas Corporation, forcing work to shut down. The tanker Texaco Plymouth experienced significant structural damage from the storm, losing two lifeboats. The freighter Buxom Island in the central Arabian Sea experienced  winds before sinking, which took the lives of 23 of its crew.

The military base in Masirah was first warned about the cyclone on June 11. The next day, officials there raised a Category 3 warning, which was soon upgraded to Category 2. Aircraft were stored in hangars, and workers inspected the roofs of buildings before riding out the storm in a shelter. After a lull during the eye's passage, winds then increased out of the southwest towards . The strong winds caused buildings to collapse and roof beams to be blown through the air. Every building at the base sustained damage, and virtually all homes in the nearby village were leveled. The radio relay station on the island was also damaged. Overall, the storm wrecked about 95% of the buildings in Masirah, leaving 2,000 people homeless there. A station on Masirah Island reported  in 24 hours, more than six times the average annual precipitation there. The total was the highest daily rainfall in the period from 1977 to 2003 nationwide. Floods washed away thousands of animals as well as lime and palm-tree plantations, downing thousands of trees across the region. The rains flooded the main highway from Muscat to Salalah, and also accumulated in the typically dry Dhofar region. There, most drains were unable to withstand the unusual flooding.

The cyclone was considered the worst disaster in Oman during the 20th century, and remains the deadliest cyclone as of 2010. Overall, the cyclone caused 105 deaths, and over 5,000 injuries, and left about 20,000 people homeless. The death toll is disputed, as another report indicated 110 deaths in Oman. After the storm, neighboring Saudi Arabia sent assistance to Oman, as did other nations in the Persian Gulf. The cyclone struck before the nation created a coordinated disaster network in 1988; as a result, the relief work was spread among various agencies.

See also
List of Arabian Peninsula tropical cyclones
Cyclone Gonu
Cyclone Phet

References

1977 Oman cyclone
Oman Cyclone, 1977
Severe cyclonic storms